Zembiškis (formerly) is a village in Kėdainiai district municipality, in Kaunas County, in central Lithuania. According to the 2011 census, the village was uninhabited. The forest road Skirgailinė-Trankiniai goes through the village. The Zembiškis Forest Botanical Sanctuary is located here.

There was a manor in Zembiškis at the end of the 19th century.

Demography

References

Villages in Kaunas County
Kėdainiai District Municipality